Yuquan Subdistrict is a subdistrict in Dangyang, Hubei, China. , it administers Niangniangmiao Residential Community and the following 15 villages:
Yuquan Village 
Zilong Village
Heyi Village
Yanwumiao Village
Guanlingmiao Village
Xiongfeng Village
Guandaohe Village
Ganhe Village
Qingxi Village
Zaolin Village
Sanqiao Village
Liulin Village
Jinsha Village
Jiaodi Village
Baibaozhai Village

See also 
 List of township-level divisions of Hubei

References 

Township-level divisions of Hubei
Dangyang